Just Like Home is a 2011 French made for television comedy film directed by Lorenzo Gabriele.

Synopsis
After a French and a Turkish family agree to swap houses for the holidays, the French family decides to cancel its holiday as the father's company is being taken over. Too late. The Turkish family arrives and must be taken in even though the house is too small to accommodate both families. Encounters, tensions and eventually learning ensue.

Cast
  Philippe Lefebvre as Marc
 Özz Nûjen as Burhan
 Elise Tielrooy as Cécile
 Jean-Noël Martin as Le Patron de Marc
 Lika Minamoto as Jade
 Sabeline Amaury as Réceptionniste du Camping
 Shemss Audat as Defné
 Maxime Coggio as Victor
 Hanna Cohen as Miné
 Sedef Ecer as Banu
 Camille Verschuere as Betty

References

External links
 

2011 television films
2011 films
2011 comedy films
French comedy films
2010s French films